"Eyes on You" (stylized as "Eyes on you") is a song by Japanese singer-songwriter Miliyah Kato from her second studio album Diamond Princess (2007). The song was written by Kato herself, while the production was done by Yanagiman. The single was released for CD and digital download on 7 February 2007 through Mastersix Foundation as the fourth single from Diamond Princess.

"Eyes on You" is an up-tempo J-pop track with the elements of R&B and disco music. The single peaked at number 13 on the Oricon Weekly Singles Chart and has been certified gold by the Recording Industry Association of Japan with more than 100,000 units downloaded.

The song served as the theme song to the Japanese science fiction comedy film Bubble Fiction: Boom or Bust (2007) and the commercial song to the music download store Iro Melo Dx. The single's B-side track, "Kono Mama Zutto Asa Made" is a hip-hop track which incorporates the Tanto Metro and Devonte song "Everyone Falls in Love" (1997). The song was later released as the promotional single for the two versions of 12-inch single in January and July 2007, and has been certified gold with 100,000 digital units sold.

Commercial performance
In Japan, "Eyes on You" debuted at its peak, number 13 on Oricon Weekly Singles Chart, with the sales of 9,887 copies. It stayed on the chart for six weeks, selling 25,246 copies in total.

Track listing

Charts

Certification and sales

|-
! scope="row"| Japan (RIAJ)
| 
| 25,246  
|-
! scope="row"| Japan (RIAJ)
| Gold
| 100,000 
|-
|}

Release history

References

2007 singles
2007 songs
J-pop songs
Miliyah Kato songs
Mastersix Foundation singles